The Launceston to Hobart yacht race is a 285 nautical mile race, commencing at Beauty Point on the Tamar River, with competitors sailing out of the Tamar River, east along the northern coast of Tasmania (eastern Bass Strait), through Banks Strait and south down Tasmania's East Coast, through Mercury Passage between mainland Tasmania and Maria Island, across Storm Bay, to a finish line in the Derwent River. The race departs on 27 December each year.  The race is known as the L2H race (Launceston to Hobart) despite the race commencing at Beauty Point, some 45 kilometers north of Launceston .

Race history
The proposal for a Launceston to Hobart Yacht Race originated with the Geilston Bay Boat Club (in southern Tasmania) and the Derwent Sailing Squadron (DSS) (also in southern Tasmania) supported the proposal.  The Tamar Yacht Club agreed to cooperate in the staging of the race.

The race was named the Launceston to Hobart and it was to be an annual race held to coincide with the Melbourne to Hobart Yacht Race.  The ORCV conducts the Melbourne to Hobart Yacht Race and the DSS conducts the L2H and finishes both events in Hobart.  In 2007, for the first time, the Melbourne to Hobart Yacht Race (M2H) allowed entrants to sail to Hobart via the East Coast of Tasmania, now called a Melbourne to Hobart East Coaster. Previously, this race had sailed the treacherous Tasmanian west coast only.  A Launceston to Hobart race, means Tasmanian yachts could race over the Christmas to New Year period in a multi day race in Tasmanian waters.  It also meant Tasmanian yacht owners avoided the costs and time required to deliver and moor yachts in Sydney and Melbourne prior to the race start dates of 26 December (Sydney to Hobart race) or 27 December (Melbourne to Hobart race).

The plan was that three yacht races, Sydney to Hobart, Melbourne to Hobart and Launceston to Hobart, would a finish at the time of the popular Hobart Summer Festival, which includes the Taste of Tasmania.

On Tuesday 30 October 2007, Hobart Lord Mayor Rob Valentine, launched the race at a ceremony held at the Derwent Sailing Squadron. Attending the launch were the Commodores from the Derwent Sailing Squadron, Bellerive Yacht Club and Royal Yacht Club of Tasmania; Life Members of the Derwent Sailing Squadron; competitors and race officials; and representatives from Clive Peeters sponsor.

Race Details and Sailing Instructions
The race commences mid river, adjacent to the docks at Inspection Head at Beauty Point and the course is north and out the month of the Tamar River at Low Head into Bass Strait, east along the northern coast of Tasmania, through Banks Strait, then south along the east coast, through Mercury Passage (as Maria Island is a mark of the course requiring competitors keep the island to port), around Tasman Island, across Storm Bay and up the Derwent River, to a finish line off Castray Esplanade. The Launceston to Hobart shares the same finish line as the Melbourne to Hobart and Sydney to Hobart Yacht Races.

The Sailing Instructions require yachts to be a minimum of 8.5 metres in length, although those who do not meet these requirements may be granted permission to participate in the cruising division. The race is governed by the rules of the Racing Rules of Sailing (RRS) of the International Sailing Federation (ISAF) together with the prescriptions and safety regulations of Yachting Australia, the International Regulations for the Prevention of Collisions at Sea and, where applicable, the rules and regulations of the International-Rule Club (IRC) where rules 1, 2 and 3.

Race Divisions
The race offers several divisions for yachts. These are International Racing Certificate (IRC), Australian Measurement System (AMS), Performance Handicap System (PHS) and cruising division for monohulls and multihulls.

Under L2H race rules, the Overall Winner is the yacht with the lowest corrected time under IRC handicap. Previously, the Overall Winner has been eligible for only one trophy and, as a result, the next three boats moved up one place in the AMS and PHS handicap categories. The rules have been changed for the 2012 L2H to enable the Overall Winner to also receive the trophies for any Divisional first places on corrected time.

Race Trophy
The overall winner of the race, or the handicap winner, collects a perpetual trophy known as the Sphinx Tea Trophy. The trophy is affectionately known as "The Teapot" due to its original use serving tea to the Governor of Tasmania. It was later awarded to George Chevert, the skipper of a yacht named Mabel that won a Derwent Sailing Squadron pennant in 1893.

Sponsorship
The major sponsor for the inaugural race was furniture retailer Clive Peeters, thus the official naming of the event as the Clive Peeters Launceston to Hobart Yacht Race.  The race in 2008 was also known as the 2008 Clive Peeters Launceston to Hobart Yacht Race, in 2009 the Sargisons Jeweller L2H Race, in 2010 the Sargisons Jewellers and Natuzzi L2H Race, in 2011 the Optus L2H Race, in 2012 The Good Guys L2H and 2013, 2014, 2015 and 2016 as the National Pies Launceston to Hobart Yacht Race.  The 2017, 2018 and 2019 events were known as the Riversdale Estate Wines L2H. The 2020 and 2021 races were sponsored by TasPorts.

Inaugural Race - 2007
In the inaugural year in 2007, 17 yachts participated in a number of classes.  The inaugural race produced one winner for both line and handicap honors, Host Plus Executive.

Host Plus Executive achieved in the inaugural Launceston to Hobart race what Rani did in the inaugural Sydney to Hobart Yacht Race in 1945, winning line and handicap honors.

Results

Line honors winners

1 Race distance was increase in 2009 (280 to 285 nautical mile course). The 2009 race started from Inspection Head on the Tamar River at Beauty Point instead of at Low Head at the mouth of the river, increasing the length of the race to 285 nautical mile.

2 Only seven finishers in fleet.

3 Due to lack of wind the start line was changed to a new line six nautical mile down the Tamar River and out of the river at Low Head. There were 8 retirements in 2018.

Yacht Clubs: BYC (Bellerive Yacht Club), RYCT (Royal Yacht Club of Tasmania), DSS (Derwent Sailing Squadron), TYC (Tamar Yacht Club), RYCV (Royal Yacht Club of Victoria), KYC (Kettering Yacht Club), PDYC (Port Dalrymple Yacht Club)

Overall winners

1 Emotional Rescue was the provisional overall winner, but Mr Burger (Wings Three) lodged an appeal with the jury, seeking redress for time lost in going to the aid of follow competitor Rumbeat.  Rumbeat had lost steering near Waterhouse Island in Bass Strait and was towed by Mr Burger.  The L2H jury granted Mr Burger redress for the time lost. Both yachts had the same corrected time after the application of the redress and were declared joint overall winners.

2 Philosopher was granted redress of 20 minutes after standing by the dismasted RAD off Tasman Island at the height of the 50–60 knot north-westerly storm in the early hours of morning of the 29 December 2018.

3 The Overall Winner is the yacht with the lowest corrected time under AMS Handicaps. The rules have been changed for the 2021 L2H to enable the Overall Winner to also receive the trophies for any Divisional first places on corrected time.

All results

BYC - Bellerive Yacht Club;
DSS - Derwent Sailing Squadron;
GBBC - Geilston Bay Boat Club;  
KYC - Kettering Yacht Club;
PDYC - Port Dalrymple Yacht Club;
RYCT - Royal Yacht Club of Tasmania;

References

External links
 National Pies Launceston to Hobart Yacht Race - Official site
 Live Race Tracker on OceanTracker.net
 Derwent Sailing Squadron - Race's official organising authority
 Tamar Yacht Club
 New Offshore Classic - The Mercury newspaper

Sailing competitions in Australia
Sport in Hobart
Sport in Launceston, Tasmania
Sailing in Tasmania
Sports competitions in Tasmania